Litorivivens lipolytica is a Gram-negative, aerobic and lipolytic bacterium from the genus of Litorivivens which has been isolated from tidal flat sediments from the South Sea in Korea.

References 

Gammaproteobacteria
Bacteria described in 2015